Vegan cheese is a category of non-dairy, plant-based cheese analogues. Vegan cheeses range from soft fresh cheeses to aged and cultured hard grateable cheeses like plant-based Parmesan. The defining characteristic of vegan cheese is the exclusion of all animal products.

Vegan cheese can be made with components derived from vegetables, such as proteins, fats and milks (plant milks). It also can be made from seeds, such as sesame, sunflower, nuts (cashew, pine nut, peanuts, almond) and soybeans; other ingredients are coconut oil, nutritional yeast, tapioca, rice, potatoes and spices.

History 
Non-dairy cheese originated in China in the 16th century and was made with fermented tofu or whole soy.

Later homemade vegan cheeses were made from soy flour, margarine, and yeast extract. With harder margarine, this can produce a hard vegan cheese that can be sliced; softer margarine produces a softer, spreadable cheese.

The product became commercially available around the 1970s or 1980s. These initial products were lower in quality than dairy cheese or today's vegan cheese, with a waxy, chalky or plastic-like texture.

In the early 1990s, the only brand of vegan cheese available in the United States was Soymage. Since then, the number and types (e.g., mozzarella, cheddar, etc.) of widely available vegan cheeses have diversified. Also, soy-free options have since been explored. In the 1990s, vegan cheese sometimes cost twice as much as dairy cheese.

From 2018 to 2020, several new companies were founded to make animal-free cheese, including New Culture, Change Foods, Legendairy Foods, and Better Dairy. Some use genetically engineered yeast to synthesize cow milk proteins without the use of cows.

Market 
As of 2018, the market for vegan cheese grew on a global scale. According to market research, Europe had the greatest market share of 43%, followed by North America, Asia-Pacific, South America and Middle East & Africa. The global vegan cheese market is expected to attain a market value of $3.9 billion by the end of 2024, up from $2.1 billion in 2016.

According to the Plant Based Food Association, the US market for plant-based foods is anticipated to reach $4 billion in sales by 2024. The expansion is driven by the increased inclination towards vegetarian sources, rising urban populations, and greater preference towards international foods. Multiple grocery chains expanded their geographical presence within specialty stores and supermarkets to address the anticipated growth for vegan cheeses, with annual sales growth expected at 8%.

The more common types of vegan cheese being manufactured, distributed, and produced through this market are mozzarella, Parmesan, cheddar, Gouda, and cream cheese non-dairy based cheeses. These vegan cheeses are consumed in restaurants, grocery stores, bakeries, vegan school meals, and in homes. Vegan cheeses are expected to grow and diversify into the mid-2020s.

As of 2017, vegan cheese is generally more expensive than dairy cheese for consumers.

Labeling 

Labeling of vegan cheese, like other vegan dairy analogues, is controversial, with dairy industry groups pushing to prohibit the use of terms like "cheese" on non-dairy products. Labeling purely plant-based products as "cheese" is prohibited in the European Union and the United Kingdom.

In February 2019, a Vancouver, British Columbia, vegan cheese shop was ordered by the Canadian Food Inspection Agency (CFIA) to stop calling their products cheese as it was 'misleading' to consumers, despite the store stating that their cheese was always labeled as "dairy-free" and "plant-based". The CFIA later reversed the rejection and stated there was no objection for using the nomenclature "100% dairy-free plant-based cheese" provided that "it is truthful".

European Union regulations state that terms applicable to dairy products, including "cheese", can be used to market only products derived from animal milk. In June 2017 the Court of Justice of the European Union issued a judgement in relation to a German vegan food producer TofuTown, clarifying that purely plant-based products could not be labelled and sold as "plant cheese" or "veggie cheese" (Judgement in case C-422/16).

In the United Kingdom, strict standards are applied to food labelling for terms such as "milk", "cheese" and "cream", which are protected to describe dairy products and may not be used to describe non-dairy produce. In 2019, a Brixton, UK, vegan cheese shop was asked by Dairy UK to stop describing products as cheese because it 'misleads shoppers', although the store owners stated their "products were clearly marked as dairy-free."

In 2020, vegan cheese company Miyoko's Creamery filed a lawsuit against the California Department of Food and Agriculture after the department ordered the company to stop using dairy words on its packaging. In 2018, the company was sued in New York in a lawsuit that alleged customers were misled by the label "vegan butter". Company founder Miyoko Schinner is a leading advocate for free speech rights relating to vegan foods.

Ingredients 
The main ingredients are nuts, soy milk, and soy yogurt. Common plant-based proteins or vegetable proteins used in vegan cheeses are derived from edible sources of protein, such as soybeans, almond, and their milk. Food scientists use a "blend of gums, protein, solids, and fats" to create the mouthfeel and melt of dairy cheese since the ones made with nuts do not melt due to the solid base on which they are composed. One vegan cheese product aims to solve this difficulty by making cheese with casein produced by yeast rather than by cows.

Vegan cheeses used for market purpose are often not cultured or aged; instead acidic ingredients, such as lemon juice, are used to make it taste like cheese. Some cheeses are made in a different way, with more texture and taste. Ingredients of hard or firm vegan cheeses includes natural agents such as agar, carrageenan, tapioca flour, and xanthan gum.

Nutrition 

The nutritional value of vegan cheese varies.

Most vegan cheese contains no cholesterol and less saturated fat than dairy cheese. Most vegan cheese is low in calcium, though the Go Veggie brand has similar calcium content to dairy cheese. Vegan cheese is generally not a good source of protein compared to dairy cheese.

A 1998 study comparing cheddar cheese to one type of vegan cheese found that the vegan cheese had lower calories, fat, and protein, though protein content of dairy cheese varies by type. The vegan cheese had higher riboflavin and vitamin B12, making it an acceptable replacement for cheddar cheese in terms of those nutrients. On the other hand, the vegan cheese did not provide vitamin A or vitamin D, in contrast to cheddar cheese. The vegan cheese was found to be a useful source of calcium, but not as good a source as cheddar cheese.

Some vegan cheeses may be fortified to provide vitamin B12, while other vegan cheeses are not.

Production 
Plant-based proteins or vegetable proteins are derived from edible sources of protein, such as soybeans and their milk. The manufacturing process of fermentation is often in use to replicate dairy cheese texture and flavor, as well. It is made with a different process from that used in dairy cheeses, as the proteins in plant-based milk reacts differently to culturing agents and do not coagulate as the traditional cheese does. It must be aged with other methods, as ambient temperature and humidity monitoring, and culturing agents, such as rejuvelac, nondairy yogurt, or kombucha, which are not recommended to use due to the risks involved in the fermentation process, and kefir grains that are recommended but not very used at present. If these processes are not carried out properly, with good hygiene and correct fermentation methods, the product can carry pathogens, such as Salmonella, Listeria, E. coli, and others.

Bans
Production and sale of vegan cheese has been banned in Turkey since 2022.

Gallery

See also
Plant milk

References

Further reading

Cheese analogues
Vegan cuisine